Oceanside High School (California) is an American public secondary school located in Oceanside, California. It is part of the Oceanside Unified School District.

History and Campus
Oceanside High School is one of two high schools in the Oceanside Unified School District serving Oceanside, CA.  Founded in 1906, OHS originally was located on the second floor of a one-room schoolhouse located at the site of the present campus.  The school primarily serves Oceanside's beach communities and rests less than one mile from the beach.  Throughout much of the first half of the 1900s the campus served as the High School for the majority of the North San Diego County region - its territory spanned as far south as Encinitas and east to Vista. In 1934, the school opened a junior college division, which operated on the eastern side of campus and existed until the 1970s when Mira Costa College opened its own campus.

The current school grounds occupy approximately 32 acres in downtown Oceanside. The oldest building still in use on the campus is known as Senior Hall. OHS has experienced recent renovations due to the $125 million bond measure passed by Oceanside residents in 2000 that provided funding to the city's schools. The remodeled campus includes new landscaping, new athletic fields, and a new three-story Science & Technology building. A new performing arts center had its grand opening on September 30, 2017. Renovations to other existing buildings such as Senior Hall and the library were also included as part of the bond initiative.

School Traditions
The Pirate has been the school mascot since the 1930s.
School colors are green, white, black, and silver.  
A photograph of the entire senior class has been taken annually on the nearby Oceanside Municipal Pier since the 1970s.
-with the exception of class 1979 picture taken on the football field 
The graduating class holds its commencement ceremony at the Junior Seau Pier Amphitheatre adjacent to the pier.

Demographics
White/Non-Hispanic: 24.7%.
African-American/Black/Non-Hispanic: 10.5%.
Hispanic/Latino: 46.1% - the plural majority.
Asian American/Pacific Islander: 37.9%.
American Indian/Alaska Native: 0.9%.

Notable alumni
Arts and media
Barbara Mandrell - Country singer. Former Miss Oceanside. Graduated from Oceanside High School in 1967.
Jim Evans - Artist/Designer, T.A.Z. the poster artist, Photographer and Owner/Creative Director of Division 13 digital design group.

Literature
Victor Villaseñor is an acclaimed Mexican-American writer

Sports
Willie Banks 
Thad Bosley 
Willie Buchanon 
Will Buchanon 
Chris Chambliss 
Charles Dimry 
Lee Guetterman
C.R. Roberts 
Jose Perez
Joe Salave'a 
Bill Sandifer 
Junior Seau 
Gary Thomasson
Terry Vaughn 
Roberto Wallace
Sam Brenner 
Brian Schwenke
Larry Warford
Alijah Holder - football player
Jace Whittaker

Notable faculty
Steve Kinder - assistant basketball coach at the school from 1989-90

Alma Mater
Oceanside, Oceanside
Can't you hear us calling?
Alma Mater, dear to all,
to thee our hearts are tied.
Strong to fight, and fair to win.
On to victory.
Oceanside, Oceanside
Hail, Hail, Hail!

The Alma Mater is often sung after varsity football games.

Use in Media
The exteriors of Oceanside High School CA are used for the fictional Neptune High on the television show Veronica Mars.
Several shots of the Netflix show "American Vandal" have been filmed at this school.

References

External links
Official website
Official Oceanside Unified School District website

High schools in San Diego County, California
Public high schools in California
Oceanside, California
1906 establishments in California